The second edition of the Women's Asian Amateur Boxing Championships were held from November 19 to November 23, 2003, in Hisar, India.

Medalists

Medal table

References
amateur-boxing

2003
Asian Boxing